is a Japanese singer whose career began in the late 2000s singing video game soundtracks. She debuted with her first single, "One Million Miles" in 2006, when she first collaborated with the group Another Infinity.  She decided to become a singer in 1994, when she won a singing competition in junior high school. Her album Glitter peaked at number 31 on the Oricon chart.

Discography

Singles
 [2007.12.05] ONE MILLION MILES
 [2008.12.05] DRIFT OF THE WIND
 [2011.04.29] Exp.
 [2011.09.07] EXTRA Whipping Cream
 [2012.02.01] Ten no Jaku
 [2012.12.29] Fortuna

Albums
 [2012.06.06] Glitter / Kamiuta
 [2015.02.04] Din Don Dan
 [2019.03.06] All that is. Is that all?

References

1981 births
Living people
Japanese women singer-songwriters
Japanese singer-songwriters
21st-century Japanese singers
21st-century Japanese women singers